Jean-Paul Sauthier (27 May 1942 – 16 September 2016) was a French field hockey player. He competed at the 1968 Summer Olympics and the 1972 Summer Olympics.

References

External links
 

1942 births
2016 deaths
French male field hockey players
Olympic field hockey players of France
Field hockey players at the 1968 Summer Olympics
Field hockey players at the 1972 Summer Olympics
Sportspeople from Lyon